
Year 334 (CCCXXXIV) was a common year starting on Tuesday (link will display the full calendar) of the Julian calendar. At the time, it was known as the Year of the Consulship of Optatus and Caesonius (or, less frequently, year 1087 Ab urbe condita). The denomination 334 for this year has been used since the early medieval period, when the Anno Domini calendar era became the prevalent method in Europe for naming years.

Events 
 By place 
 Roman Empire 
 Flavius Dalmatius puts down a revolt in Cyprus, led by Calocaerus. Calocaerus is brought to Tarsus (Cilicia), and executed.
 The Goths protect the Danube frontier against an invasion by the Vandals.
 Emperor Constantine the Great reauthorises gladiatorial combat.

 By topic 

 Astronomy 
 Julius Firmicus Maternus makes the first recorded observation of solar prominences, during an annular eclipse (July 17).

Births 
 Huiyuan, Chinese Buddhist teacher and founder of Donglin Temple (d. 416)
 Sabbas the Goth, Christian reader and saint (d. 372)
 Virius Nicomachus Flavianus, Roman historian and politician (d. 394)

Deaths 
 December 5 – Li Ban, Chinese emperor of Cheng Han (b. 288)
 Calocaerus, Roman usurper
 Li Xiong, Chinese emperor of Cheng Han (b. 274)
 Shi Hong, Chinese emperor of the Jie state (b. 313)
 Tao Kan (or Shixing), Chinese general and politician (b. 259)
 Wei Huacun (or Xianan), Chinese religious leader (b. 252)
 Yang Nandi, Chinese general and ruler of Chouchi

References